Modesto Lara Arias (born October 29, 1973) is a male judoka from the Dominican Republic, who won the silver medal in the men's extra lightweight division (– 60 kg) at the 2003 Pan American Games in Santo Domingo, Dominican Republic. He represented his native country at the 2004 Summer Olympics in Athens, Greece.

References
 sports-reference

1973 births
Living people
Dominican Republic male judoka
Judoka at the 2003 Pan American Games
Judoka at the 2004 Summer Olympics
Olympic judoka of the Dominican Republic
Pan American Games silver medalists for the Dominican Republic
Pan American Games medalists in judo
Central American and Caribbean Games bronze medalists for the Dominican Republic
Competitors at the 2006 Central American and Caribbean Games
Central American and Caribbean Games medalists in judo
Medalists at the 2003 Pan American Games
20th-century Dominican Republic people
21st-century Dominican Republic people